Boniface is a given name and a surname. The best known of those who bear the name is Saint Boniface (c. 675?–754), an important leader in early Christianity and the  "Apostle of the Germans". Others named Boniface include:

Given name

Religious figures 
 Boniface of Tarsus, saint who was martyred in 307, according to legend
 Boniface, African martyr, 5th century
 Pope Boniface I (died 422)
 Pope Boniface II (died 532)
 Pope Boniface III (died 607)
 Pope Boniface IV (c. 550–615)
 Pope Boniface V (died 625)
 Saint Curetán (fl. 690-710), Bishop of Rosemarkie, also known as Boniface
 Pope Boniface VI (died 896)
 Antipope Boniface VII (died 985)
 Bruno of Querfurt (c. 974-1009), also known as Boniface, sainted missionary bishop and martyr, the "Apostle to the Prussians"
 Boniface of Valperga (died 1243), venerated Bishop of Aosta
 Boniface of Brussels (1183–1260), Bishop of Lausanne
 Boniface of Savoy (bishop) (c. 1217-1270)
 Pope Boniface VIII (c. 1230–1303), responsible for issuing the papal bull Unam sanctam
 Pope Boniface IX (c. 1350–1404)
 Boniface Adoyo, Kenyan bishop and opponent of the theory of evolution
 Boniface Lele (1947-2014), Kenyan Roman Catholic bishop and archbishop
 Boniface Wimmer (1809–1887), German monk who founded the first Benedictine monastery in the United States
 Boniface Hardin (1933-2012), American Benedictine monk
 Bonifatius Haushiku (1932-2002), Namibian bishop

Rulers and soldiers
 Bonifacius, a 5th-century Roman general also known as Count Boniface
 Boniface, Duke of Alsace (fl. mid 7th century)
 Boniface, Count of Bologna and Margrave of Tuscany (died probably 1101)
 Boniface de Castellane, Marquis de Castellane, (1788-1862), Marshal of France
 Boniface I of Challant (died 1426)
 Boniface I, Marquess of Montferrat (c. 1150-1207), Italian chosen as leader of the Fourth Crusade
 Boniface II, Marquess of Montferrat (1202-1253)
 Bonifaci VI de Castellana, a Provençal knight known as Boniface de Castellane (fl. 1244-1265)
 Boniface III, Marquess of Montferrat (1426-1494)
 Boniface IV, Marquess of Montferrat, (1512-1530)
 Boniface del Vasto (c. 1060-c. 1130), Margrave of Savona and Western Liguria
 Boniface, Count of Savoy (1245-1263)
 Boniface I, Margrave of Tuscany (died 823)
 Boniface II, Margrave of Tuscany (died c. 838)
 Boniface III, Margrave of Tuscany (c. 985-1052)
 Boniface of Verona (died 1317 or 1318), Lombard Crusader lord in Frankish Greece
 Boniface Sifu, chief of the Mayeyi people of Namibia
 Boniface Bebi, former chief of the Mafwe people of Namibia

Politicians
 Boniface Alexandre (born 1936), Haitian politician, acting President of Haiti (2004-2006)
 Boniface Berthin Zakahely, Malagasy politician
 Boniface S. Emerengwa, Nigerian lawyer and politician
 Boniface Florescu (1848–1899), Romanian polygraph and politician
 Boniface Kabaka (died 2020), Kenyan politician

Athletes
 Boniface Ambani (born 1982), Kenyan retired footballer
 Boniface Toroitich Kiprop (born 1985), Ugandan long-distance runner
 Boniface Merande (born 1962), Kenyan retired middle-distance runner
 Boniface N'Dong (born 1977), Senegalese retired professional basketball player
 Boniface Simutowe (1949-2014), Zambian soccer player
 Boniface Songok (born 1980), Kenyan middle-distance runner
 Boniface Usisivu (born 1974), Kenyan marathon runner

Other
 Boniface Mwangi, Kenyan activist

Surname
 André Boniface (born 1934), French retired rugby union player
 Bruce Boniface (born 1981), singer, songwriter and producer whose stage name is Boniface
 Charles Etienne Boniface (1787-1853), French music teacher, playwright, journalist and polyglot
 Frédéric Boniface (born 1971), French former footballer
 George C. Boniface (1832-1912), American actor
 Guy Boniface (1937-1968), French rugby union footballer
 Gwen Boniface, Canadian police officer, lawyer and first female Commissioner of the Ontario Provincial Police (1998-2006)
 Symona Boniface (1894-1950), American film actress, particularly in Three Stooges shorts
 Victor Boniface, (born 2000), Nigerian footballer
 William Boniface (1963-), American children's book author

See also
 Bonifaci Ferrer (1350–1417), Carthusian monk
 Bonifacio (disambiguation)
 Bonifacius (given name), a short list of people named Bonifacius or Bonifatius
 Bonifas
 Bonifaz